Crush is a 2014 Indonesian drama and musical film directed by Rizal Mantovani. This movie starring by Cherrybelle, Deva Mahenra, Yuanita Christiani, Indrodjojo Kusumonegoro, Farhan, and Erin Shay. This film had a budget of Rp. 15 billion (about $1 million US dollars).

Plot
Girlband Cherrybelle consisting Cherly (Cherly Yuliana Anggraini), Angel (Margareth Angelina), Christy (Christy Saura Noela Uni), Gigi (Brigitta Cynthia), Ryn (Jessyca Stefani Auryn), Steffy (Stefanny Margaretha Aay), Felly (Yefani Filliang), Kezia (Kezia Karamoy), and Anisa (Anisa Rahma) requested by the producer (Farhan), to create a new dance choreographed for the sake of Cherrybelle' image more progressive than any other girlband in Indonesia. And finally, Anisa (Anisa Rahma) resigned from Cherrybelle because she wanted to continue her studies.

The management also bring in a new coach, Andre (Deva Mahenra), which is known as a reliable senior dancer in Jakarta. Andre' charismatic presence makes Cherrybelle' members uncomfortable, especially Kezia. Until one day, Andre finds a love letter from a secret fan. This makes Andre angry and disappointed to decide to quit teaching. Cherly, as leader of Cherrybelle, feeling guilty. When she was searching for Andre, Cherly know that Andre had gone to the town of Glenmore. According to Ryn, the city was in Australia, precisely near the city of Melbourne. Meanwhile, Angel face off her own problems. Her sister, Karen (Yuanita Christiani), who has lived in Melbourne on a year, continuous insulting Angel to spend time with Cherrybelle, the eyes of Karen, just a circus.

On the other occasion, Cherrybelle get bonus travel to Melbourne. All members of Cherrybelle excited, especially Cherly, who intends to seek Andre there. But not with Angel, because she had to meet with Karen.

Arriving in Melbourne, they focused search for Andre to ask him back as coach. But there it Cherrybelle must against with Karen and her dance group. Results of the search, Andre was doesn't there and they returned to Jakarta. But apparently the town of Glenmore in question, is not in Australia, but it is located in one of the villages in Indonesia precisely the name of the sub-district in Banyuwangi. Cherrybelle with the spirit came to Glenmore.

Cast
Margareth Angelina as Angel
 Cherly Yuliana Anggraini as Cherly
 Christy Saura Noela Unu as Christy
 Kezia Karamoy as Kezia
 Brigitta Cynthia as Gigi
 Jessica Stefani Auryn as Ryn
 Stefanny Margaretha Aay as Steffy
 Yefani Filliang as Felly
 Anisa Rahma as Anisa
 Deva Mahenra as Andre, a senior dancer who really disappointed because a love letter and decided to quit as teaching
 Yuanita Christiani as Karen, Angel' oldest sister who always insult to Angel because spend time of Cherrybelle
 Farhan as Cherrybelle' manager
 Indrodjojo Kusumonegoro as Andre' grandfather
 Sam Brodie as the director
 Irving Artemas as Reza
 Erin Shay as Rima
 Mikhaela Jade as Stacey
 Endang Nastiti as Julie
 Teguh Sanjaya as Agung

Filming process
According to the director, Rizal Mantovani, this movie filmed in two cities in country: Jakarta, Indonesia and Melbourne, Australia. During the course of filming process, Rizal admitted encountered some obstacles. But these obstacles successfully completed well as supported by the crew and players have high professionalism. And Rizal said "There [Australia] due to the limited time and the weather was not erratic, so when shooting bright, suddenly dark, was afraid the color is mottled but all can be overcome."

Soundtrack
This movie is also soundtrack with the song "Dunia Tersenyum", which performed by Cherrybelle, and also starring this movie.

References

External links
 

2014 films
2010s Indonesian-language films
Films shot in Australia
Films shot in Indonesia
Indonesian musical drama films
2010s musical drama films
2014 drama films